Josh Bolton (born May 26, 1984 in Penfield, New York) is an American soccer player who last played for Charleston Battery in the USL Second Division.

Career

Youth
Bolton grew up in Penfield, New York, and was a childhood fan of the Rochester Rhinos. He graduated in 2002 from Penfield High School.  He attended Williams College, playing on the men’s soccer team from 2002 to 2005.  He was a 2004 and 2005 1st Team All American. and the 2004 and 2005 New England Small College Athletic Conference Player of the Year.

Professional
In 2005, Bolton spent the collegiate off season with the Albany Admirals in the Premier Development League.  In 2006, he signed with the Rochester Rhinos of the USL First Division going on loan with the Wilmington Hammerheads of the USL Second Division for one game.  In April 2007, the Rhinos loaned Bolton to the Harrisburg City Islanders of the USL-2 for two games.  On February 13, 2008, Bolton signed with the Atlanta Silverbacks of USL-1.

After spending a year out of professional soccer in 2009, Charleston Battery announced the signing of Bolton to a contract for the 2010 season.

Bolton was not included on the 2011 roster released by Charleston on April 7, 2011.

Honors

Charleston Battery
USL Second Division Champions (1): 2010
USL Second Division Regular Season Champions (1): 2010

References

External links
 Charleston Battery bio
 Atlanta Silverbacks bio

1984 births
Living people
Albany BWP Highlanders players
American soccer players
Atlanta Silverbacks players
Charleston Battery players
Penn FC players
USL First Division players
USL Second Division players
USL League Two players
Rochester New York FC players
Wilmington Hammerheads FC players
Williams Ephs men's soccer players
Soccer players from New York (state)
Sportspeople from Rochester, New York
People from Penfield, New York
Association football midfielders